Zbudské Dlhé is a village and municipality in Humenné District in the Prešov Region of north-east Slovakia.

History
In historical records the village was first mentioned in 1414.

Geography
The municipality lies at an altitude of 212 metres and covers an area of 8.357 km2.
It has a population of about 585 people.

References

External links
 
 
https://web.archive.org/web/20071116010355/http://www.statistics.sk/mosmis/eng/run.html

Villages and municipalities in Humenné District